Taariq Chiecktey is a South African first-class cricketer. He is a right-handed batsman and a wicketkeeper. He made his First Class debut for Western Province against Border

References

External links
 

1993 births
Living people
South African cricketers
Western Province cricketers